Astrid Birgitta Holm (born 4 June 1936) is a Swedish author and professor emerita in literary studies at Uppsala University.

Early life 
Holm was born in Stockholm.

Awards 

 2002 - Lotten von Kræmer's Prize
 2004 - Schückska Prize
 2006 - Moa Prize (Moa Martinson Scholarship)
 2020 - The Mårbacka Prize

Personal life 
She was a friend of the author Agneta Klingspor, and was at her side when she died in June 2022.

References

Sources
 

Living people
1936 births
Academic staff of Uppsala University
20th-century Swedish women writers
21st-century Swedish women writers
Swedish literary scholars
Swedish scientists
Swedish-language writers

People from Stockholm